The 2015 Hamburg state election was held on 15 February 2015 to elect the members of the 21st Hamburg Parliament. The incumbent Social Democratic Party (SPD) government led by First Mayor Olaf Scholz lost its majority. The SPD subsequently formed a coalition government with The Greens, and Scholz continued in office.

Parties
The table below lists parties represented in the 20th Hamburg Parliament.

Opinion polling

Election result

|-
! colspan="2" | Party
! Votes
! %
! +/-
! Seats 
! +/-
! Seats %
|-
| bgcolor=| 
| align=left | Social Democratic Party (SPD)
| align=right| 1,611,274
| align=right| 45.6
| align=right| 2.8
| align=right| 58
| align=right| 4
| align=right| 47.9
|-
| bgcolor=| 
| align=left | Christian Democratic Union (CDU)
| align=right| 561,377
| align=right| 15.9
| align=right| 6.0
| align=right| 20
| align=right| 8
| align=right| 16.5
|-
| bgcolor=| 
| align=left | Alliance 90/The Greens (Grüne)
| align=right| 432,713
| align=right| 12.3
| align=right| 1.1
| align=right| 15
| align=right| 1
| align=right| 12.4
|-
| bgcolor=| 
| align=left | The Left (Linke)
| align=right| 300,567
| align=right| 8.5
| align=right| 2.1
| align=right| 11
| align=right| 3
| align=right| 9.1
|-
| bgcolor=| 
| align=left | Free Democratic Party (FDP)
| align=right| 262,157
| align=right| 7.4
| align=right| 0.7
| align=right| 9
| align=right| 0
| align=right| 7.4
|-
| bgcolor=| 
| align=left | Alternative for Germany (AfD)
| align=right| 214,833
| align=right| 6.1
| align=right| New
| align=right| 8
| align=right| New
| align=right| 6.6
|-
! colspan=8|
|-
| bgcolor=| 
| align=left | Pirate Party Germany (Piraten)
| align=right| 54,802
| align=right| 1.6
| align=right| 0.5
| align=right| 0
| align=right| ±0
| align=right| 0
|-
| bgcolor=|
| align=left | Others
| align=right| 92,374
| align=right| 2.6
| align=right| 
| align=right| 0
| align=right| ±0
| align=right| 0
|-
! align=right colspan=2| Total
! align=right| 3,530,097
! align=right| 100.0
! align=right| 
! align=right| 121
! align=right| ±0
! align=right| 
|-
! align=right colspan=2| Voter turnout
! align=right| 
! align=right| 56.5
! align=right| 0.8
! align=right| 
! align=right| 
! align=right| 
|}

See also
Elections in Hamburg
Hamburg state elections in the Weimar Republic

References

External links

2015 elections in Germany
2015 state election
2015
February 2015 events in Germany
Olaf Scholz